Markus Tanner (born 15 January 1954) is a Swiss former footballer who played as a striker.

He began his career with FC Basel during the 1970s, and later signed for FC Lucerne in 1981, where he played until 1985. He was also a Swiss internationalist with ten caps and one goal. He made his international debut against the Netherlands on 11 October 1978 in Bern, and played his last match against the same opposition on 1 September 1981 in Zürich.

References

 
 

1954 births
Living people
Swiss men's footballers
Switzerland international footballers
FC Basel players
FC Luzern players
FC Zürich players
Association football forwards